Svetlana Badulina is a former volleyball player for the USSR.

References 

Living people
1960 births
Soviet women's volleyball players
Olympic volleyball players of the Soviet Union
Volleyball players at the 1980 Summer Olympics
Olympic gold medalists for the Soviet Union
Olympic medalists in volleyball
Medalists at the 1980 Summer Olympics
Honoured Masters of Sport of the USSR